The Lincoln MKS is a full-sized luxury sedan that was manufactured and marketed by the Lincoln subdivision of Ford from 2008 to 2016. First shown at the LA Auto Show in November 2007, the MKS began production for the 2009 model year at Ford's Chicago Assembly plant in May 2008 with sales beginning a month later.  The MKS was the second Lincoln to adopt the "MK" nomenclature and the first model to wear it through its entire production run.  With the discontinuation of the Lincoln Town Car in 2011, the MKS at 205.6-inches in length became the longest production sedan sold by an American automaker through 2016.

Sharing the Ford D3 platform with the fifth and sixth-generation Ford Taurus, the Lincoln MKS offered front-wheel drive with optional all-wheel drive (a first in a full-size Lincoln).  Shared with the Taurus SHO, the 3.5L EcoBoost twin-turbocharged V6 became the first turbocharged gasoline engine in a Lincoln.

The Lincoln MKS was discontinued after the 2016 model year and replaced by the new Lincoln Continental.

2006 MKS Concept
The Lincoln MKS made its first appearance as a concept car at the 2006 North American International Auto Show in Detroit, Michigan. The MKS Concept provided a preliminary view of the design direction that Lincoln was taking for their new full-size flagship sedan of the same name.

The MKS included Lincoln's signature waterfall grille with a crosshatching that was later used in the grille for the 2007-2009 Lincoln MKZ. The concept car's headlights featured adaptive lighting that pivoted the headlight projectors in concert with steering inputs. The headlight assemblies incorporated a series of LEDs that would blink in sequence for turn indication. Side vents at the rear of the front wheel wells were adorned with the Lincoln star. The MKS Concept featured a large sunroof and moonroof combination that takes the place of a conventional roof. The MKS Concept's rear were LED-based parking and brake lamps and dual chrome, trapezoidal-shaped exhaust tips. The MKS Concept rode on 20x8.5-inch, ten spoke wheels.

The MKS Concept seats were covered in cream-colored Aniline leather while the doors and interior panels were covered in pearl-white suede. The dashboard was covered in dark grey suede. Instrumentation and controls featured satin nickel inserts and chrome trim with backlighting provided by white LEDs. An applique of real maple wood ran across the instrument panel, dividing it into upper and lower sections. Features included Bluetooth device connectivity, a DVD-based navigation system, a 14-speaker, 500-watt audio system, a passive entry system that identifies the driver and allows starting the vehicle by carrying its key fob, and a push button ignition system. Safety was provided by dual front airbags, driver and passenger side airbags, and side curtain airbags.

The MKS Concept was based on Ford's front-wheel drive, Volvo-derived D3 Automobile platform that was already in use in the then-Ford Five Hundred, Ford Freestyle, and Mercury Montego (the version used for the MKS in particular was coded D385). It has independent suspension with MacPherson struts and rearward-facing lower L-arms with a stabilizer bar in the front and a multilink coil over shock setup with a stabilizer bar in the rear. The MKS Concept featured an active all-wheel drive system. Powering the MKS Concept was a Ford/Yamaha 4.4 L DOHC V8 producing 315 hp (235 kW) at 4500 rpm and 320 lb·ft (433 N·m) of torque at 3000 rpm. The engine was mated to a 6-speed automatic transmission.

MKS (2009–2016)

The production version of the Lincoln MKS was unveiled to the public in November 2007 at the LA Auto Show. Sales began in the summer of 2008 as a 2009 model. The front fascia of the production version received a new grille, a chrome, split-wing design. The trapezoidal-shaped chrome exhaust tips of the MKS Concept were replaced with more common circular chrome tips.

The production MKS uses leather seating surfaces, thermoplastic olefin door and interior panels, as well as leatherette for the top of the dashboard. The maple wood instrument panel applique from the concept car was replaced with olive-ash or ebony wood.

The MKS was the first series production Lincoln with radar autonomous cruise control system. Other features include intelligent access system with a push button start, a keyless entry keypad that is mounted flush inside the driver-side B-pillar with buttons that only appear when touched, and optional adaptive HID headlights. Other features include automatic HID headlights, foglights, an Easy Fuel capless fuel filler, foldable power adjustable mirrors with memory, 18x7.5-inch machined aluminum wheels, a 6-speaker audio system with an AM/FM radio and 6-disc in-dash CD changer, Sirius satellite radio with a six-month prepaid subscription, dual-zone automatic climate control, an auto-dimming rear view mirror with compass, 12-way, heated and cooled power driver and passenger seats, heated rear seats, a power tilt and telescoping steering wheel with memory, a universal garage door opener, and Lincoln SYNC.

Safety features include dual front airbags, driver and passenger side airbags, and side curtain airbags. Three equipment packages include the Navigation Package (a DVD navigation system, a THX II-Certified, 14-speaker, 600-watt audio system with an AM/FM radio and six-disc in-dash CD player, and a rearview camera); Technology Package (adaptive HID headlights, rain-sensing windshield wipers, a forward-sensing system, a power sunshade for the rear window, and the intelligent access system with push button start); the Ultimate Package includes everything in the Navigation and Technology packages and a dual panel moonroof, premium 19x8-inch painted alloy wheels, Ultimate seating trim with color-keyed suede strip in the center of the seat back, and a Lincoln Star logo embroidered into the front seat headrests; an Aluminum Applique Package (aluminum dash trim in the place of wood, as well as a leather-wrapped steering wheel and shift knob), is also available but requires the Navigation, Technology, or Ultimate packages. Options include all-wheel drive, 19x8-inch machined aluminum wheels, 20x8-inch polished aluminum wheels, adaptive cruise control, and a PowerCode remote starter.

Active Park Assist, a system which uses ultrasonic sensors to find and measure a parking space, then operate the steering wheel to accomplish the parallel parking task, will be available in mid-2009 as an option on the 2010 MKS. This feature is accomplished by using software control of the Electric Power Steering (EPS) system.

The production MKS rides on Ford's D3 platform. The MKS features an independent suspension with MacPherson struts and rearward-facing lower L-arms with a  stabilizer bar in the front and a multilink coil over shock setup with stamped steel lower control arms and cast upper control arms in the rear; "Lincoln Drive Control" with continuously controlled damping (CCD) available as optional feature. The car features four-wheel antilock disc brakes ( rotors in the front and  rotors in the rear) with standard AdvanceTrac traction control and Roll Stability Control (RSC). Front-wheel drive (FWD) is standard while all-wheel drive (AWD) is optional. In a significant departure from the MKS Concept and past Lincoln flagship sedans, the production MKS does not offer a V8 engine. In the place of the 4.4 L Ford/Yamaha V8 found in the MKS Concept, the production MKS is powered by an all-aluminum 3.7 L Duratec DOHC V6, a larger bore derivative of the Duratec 35 and a member of Ford's Cyclone engine family. The engine was designed to accept either regular grade, 87 octane gasoline or premium grade, 91 octane gasoline. Using regular grade gasoline, the 3.7 L V6 produces 273 hp (204 kW) at 6250 rpm and 270 lb·ft (366 N·m) of torque at 4250 rpm. Using premium grade gasoline results in a small boost in output to 275 hp (205 kW) at 6250 rpm and 276 lb·ft (374 N·m) of torque at 4250 rpm. Power from the MKS' V6 is transmitted to the wheels via Ford's 6F50 6-speed automatic transmission. The transmission is equipped with SelectShift which simulates the operation of a manual transmission. Testers noted the MKS' heavy weight of over 4300 lbs. Ford introduced its EcoBoost V6, an all-aluminum, twin-turbocharged, direct injection 3.5 L DOHC V6, in the 2010 MKS arriving in showrooms in the summer of 2009.

2013 facelift

The facelifted 2013 model year MKS debuted at the 2011 Los Angeles International Auto Show, with a mildly refreshed exterior and interior (front "Multicontour" seats) as well as safety updates such as auto high beam, adaptive cruise control, forward collision warning, blind spot information system with cross-traffic alert, and lane-keeping system.

For 2015, the deck lid once again received aesthetic changes. A chrome trim section was added, stretching horizontally across the lid. The Lincoln lettering was increased in size and centered above this new trim section following along the length of it. The MKS emblem was moved to the left side corner of the lid.

Reception
A reviewer from Canada's National Post gave the MKS a positive reception in a comparison test with the Cadillac STS and Infiniti M45, two cars that Ford picked to bring along.

The MKS has dimensions comparable to the 2010 Audi A8 4.2 FSI quattro, a sedan with all-wheel drive which is equipped with a naturally aspirated 4.2 L V8 engine with direct gasoline injection. The MKS is almost an inch longer than the A8L (long-wheelbase version), an inch wider and five inches (127 mm) taller, has four more cubic feet of trunk space, and extra  of torque, while being  lighter. The MKS starts at $30,000 less than the base A8. The MKS also undercuts several mid-luxury cars with V8 engines and all-wheel drive by $10,000, such as the Audi A6 4.2 FSI quattro and the Infiniti M45x.

While praised for its large interior and long list of features, the MKS has been criticized for not being as refined as other luxury sedans in a similar price range. It is also noted that the MKS's platform-mate, the Ford Taurus, offers the same powertrain and many available technological features, starting at an MSRP of $10,000 less than the MKS.

End of production
Due to declining sales, the Lincoln MKS was replaced by a new car based on the Lincoln Continental concept in 2016. The Chicago Assembly Plant where the MKS was produced continued to manufacture the Ford Taurus (until March 2019). The plant continues to build the Ford Explorer and Police Interceptor vehicles.

Yearly American sales

References

External links

Official Website

MKS
MKS
2010s cars
All-wheel-drive vehicles
Cars introduced in 2008
Limousines